Princess Reishi  (姈子内親王; 5 October 1270 – 22 August 1307), later Yūgimon'in (遊義門院), was an Empress of Japan, married to her cousin Emperor Go-Uda.

She was the daughter of Emperor Go-Fukakusa and Fujiwara no Kimiko. She was named Empress to her cousin in 1285.

Notes

Japanese empresses
1270 births
1307 deaths
Japanese princesses
People from Kyoto